The Democratic Labour Federation of Cyprus (DEOK) is a trade union centre in Cyprus. It is affiliated with the European Trade Union Confederation and the International Trade Union Confederation. The trade union also have close ties with EDEK.

References

External links
deok.org.cy

Trade unions in Cyprus
International Trade Union Confederation
National federations of trade unions
Trade unions established in 1962